Argentobaumhauerite (IMA symbol: Abha) is a rare mineral with the chemical formula AgPbAsS. Its type locality is the Binn valley in Switzerland.

References

External links 

 Argentobaumhauerite data sheet
 Argentobaumhauerite on the Handbook of Mineralogy

Silver minerals
Lead minerals
Arsenic minerals
Sulfur(−II) compounds